The 2016 Quebec Scotties Tournament of Hearts, the provincial women's curling championship of Quebec, was held from January 17 to 24 at Aréna Salaberry in Salaberry-de-Valleyfield, Quebec. The winning Marie-France Larouche rink will represent Quebec at the 2016 Scotties Tournament of Hearts. The event was held in conjunction with the 2016 Quebec Men's Provincial Curling Championship.

Teams
The teams are listed as follows:

Standings

Scores

January 18

Draw 2
Monday, January 18, 8:15 am

Draw 4
Monday, January 18, 15:45 am

January 19

Draw 6
Tuesday, January 18, 08:15 am

Draw 8
Tuesday, January 18, 15:45 pm

January 20

Draw 11
Wednesday, January 19, 08:15 am

Draw 13
Wednesday, January 19, 19:30 pm

January 21

Draw 14
Thursday, January 18, 09:00 am

Draw 16
Thursday, January 18, 19:30 pm

January 22

Draw 17
Friday, January 22, 10:00 am

Draw 18
Friday, January 22, 14:30 pm

Playoffs

Semifinal
Saturday, January 23, 7:30 pm

Final
Sunday, January 24, 12:00 pm

References

2016 Scotties Tournament of Hearts
Curling competitions in Quebec
Salaberry-de-Valleyfield
Quebec Scotties